Bivinia is a genus of flowering plants in the family Salicaceae, sometimes included in Calantica. It contains a single species, Bivinia jalbertii, which is found in Kenya, Madagascar, Mozambique, Tanzania and Zimbabwe.

References

Salicaceae
Salicaceae genera
Monotypic Malpighiales genera
Least concern plants
Taxa named by Edmond Tulasne
Taxonomy articles created by Polbot